Eretmodus marksmithi is a small species of fish in the family Cichlidae. It is found in the northern two thirds to three-fourths of Lake Tanganyika.

References

marksmithi
Fish described in 2012